You Don't Have to be Jewish is a 1965 comedy album written by Bob Booker and George Foster, the team behind the 1962 comedy album The First Family.

Production 
The album features Lou Jacobi, Betty Walker, Jack Gilford, Joe Silver, Jackie Kannon, Bob McFadden, Frank Gallop, and Arlene Golonka, in a variety of roles, mostly Jewish, performing a mixture of jokes and comedy sketches. The album was recorded with a live audience, as the cast performed a script, like a radio play.

Reception 
The album was highly successful, with syndicated columnist Walter Winchell calling the album "the No. 1 seller in Suburbia" and noting that as a popular gift "it has replaced the fountain pen at Bar Mitzvahs."

Sequel 
A sequel, When You're in Love, the Whole World is Jewish, largely reunited the original cast but replaced the unavailable Golonka with her roommate, Valerie Harper.

Name
"You Don't Have to be Jewish to love Levy's" was an advertising campaign for Levy's rye bread that began in 1961 and ran through the 1970s.

Track listing

References 

1965 albums
1960s comedy albums
1960s spoken word albums
Concept albums
Kapp Records albums